Leland Gantt is an American actor and writer known for his roles in various television series and films. Gantt is also a theatre actor, and has appeared in a one-man show, Rhapsody in Black.

Early life and education 
Gantt was born and raised in McKeesport, Pennsylvania. After graduating from McKeesport Area High School, he attended the Indiana University of Pennsylvania before earning a Bachelor of Arts degree from Point Park College. After struggling with drug and alcohol addiction, Gantt was inspired to pursue acting by a theatre teacher and moved to New York City in 1983.

Career 
After moving to New York, Gantt appeared in Broadway productions of Ma Rainey's Black Bottom, Fences, Richard III, Crumbs from the Table of Joy, Gem of the Ocean, Judas Iscariot, and The Fall of Heaven. In 1991, Gantt was nominated for the Drama Desk Award for Outstanding Featured Actor in a Play for his performance in Let Me Live, losing to Kevin Spacey.

Gantt has also appeared in episodes of Law & Order and JAG. He portrayed Martin Luther King Jr. in the 1987 miniseries Hoover vs. The Kennedys. He also starred in The Affair.

Filmography

Film

Television

References 

Living people
African-American actors
People from McKeesport, Pennsylvania
Point Park University alumni
Male actors from Pennsylvania
20th-century American male actors
21st-century American male actors
Male actors from New York City
Year of birth missing (living people)
20th-century African-American people
21st-century African-American people